Leda (minor planet designation: 38 Leda) is a large, dark main-belt asteroid that was discovered by French astronomer J. Chacornac on January 12, 1856, and named after Leda, the mother of Helen of Troy in Greek mythology. In the Tholen classification system, it is categorized as a carbonaceous C-type asteroid, while the Bus asteroid taxonomy system lists it as a Cgh asteroid. The spectra of the asteroid displays evidence of aqueous alteration.

Leda has been studied by radar. During 2002, 38 Leda was observed by radar from the Arecibo Observatory. The return signal matched an effective diameter of 116 ± 13 km. This is consistent with the asteroid dimensions computed through other means. Based upon a light curve that was generated from photometric observations of this asteroid at Pulkovo Observatory, it has a rotation period of 12.834 ± 0.001 hours and varies in brightness by 0.15 ± 0.01 in magnitude.

References

External links
 
 

Background asteroids
Leda
Leda
C-type asteroids (Tholen)
Cgh-type asteroids (SMASS)
18560112